Emperor Yuan  may refer to:
 Emperor Yuan of Han (75 BC–33 BC)
 Emperor Yuan of Wei (246 - 303), See Cáo Huàn
 Emperor Yuan of Jin (276 - 323)
 Emperor Yuan of Liang (508 - 554)